Shawn Pelton is an American drummer and percussionist. He has recorded with a wide range of artists and has been a first call player since moving to New York in the late 1980s.

Pelton has recorded with artists such as Sheryl Crow, Shawn Colvin, Natalie Merchant, Ingrid Michaelson, Billy Joel, Van Morrison, Elton John, Rod Stewart, Johnny Cash, Rosanne Cash, Pink, Shakira, Kelly Clarkson, Five For Fighting, Michelle Branch, Regina Spektor, Tears for Fears, Gianluca Grignani, Citizen Cope, Matisyahu, Jonatha Brooke, David Byrne, Edie Brickell, Marc Cohn, Richie Havens, Joan Osborne, Hall and Oates, Odetta, Pavarotti, Phillip Phillips, George Michael, Carly Simon, Dixie Chicks, Chris Botti and Buddy Guy, and has played on several Grammy winning albums for artists including Ray Charles, The Brecker Brothers, Shawn Colvin, Les Paul and the Hank Williams tribute album with Bob Dylan.

Pelton is also the longtime drummer in the house band for the NBC TV network's sketch comedy and music program Saturday Night Live.

Shawn was the touring drummer on Jon Bon Jovi's Destination Anywhere tour in 1997-1998.

Early life
Pelton was born in Kansas City, Missouri.

"I grew up always banging on things," Pelton said describing his childhood. His first real musical instrument was a cello in 5th grade. But he "bailed as soon as possible to the drums," Pelton said. "I was running around doing gigs at 14, which was a great situation, to actually be in a band that young. The sooner you start making music with other people the better."

Education
Pelton studied at Indiana University's Jacobs School of Music in Bloomington, Indiana, earning a bachelor's degree and a Performer's Certificate in 1985. While there, Pelton studied with Kenny Aronoff, who at the time was the drummer for John Mellencamp. During his summer breaks, Pelton sought out experts elsewhere, including Alan Dawson, who is best known as an early teacher of jazz drummer Tony Williams.

During his time as a student, Pelton taught for a brief period, and also conducted private drum lessons. One of his students was Pete Wilhoit, who would later become a member of Fiction Plane, the opening act for The Police on their 2007 reunion global tour.

Career
He joined the Saturday Night Live band in 1992, saying "It’s a pretty mellow gig...It’s really only 20 days out of the year."

Since 2007, Pelton has been regularly appearing as the drummer on Daryl Hall's internet concert series Live from Daryl's House.

Nicknamed "Cat Daddy" by drum tech, Tim Soya.

Pelton also served periodically as the substitute drummer in the CBS Orchestra on Late Show with David Letterman during regular drummer Anton Fig's absences.

Pelton is also a founding member of the NYC-based band The Cringe.

Selected discography

Collaborations 
 Picture Perfect Morning - Edie Brickell (1994)
 A Few Small Repairs - Shawn Colvin (1996)
 Let's Talk About Love - Céline Dion (1997)
 Credo - Jennifer Rush (1997)
 Campi di Popcorn - Gianluca Grignani (1998)
 Burning The Daze - Marc Cohn (1998)
 Holiday Songs and Lullabies - Shawn Colvin (1998)
 Barefoot on the Beach - Michael Franks (1999)
 Joy: A Holiday Collection - Jewel (1999)
 Timeless: The Classics Vol. 2 - Michael Bolton (1999)
 Songs from the Last Century - George Michael (1999)
 The Bedroom Tapes - Carly Simon (2000)
 Whole New You - Shawn Colvin (2001)
 Look Into the Eyeball - David Byrne (2001)
 M.Y.O.B. - Debbie Gibson (2001)
 It Had to Be You: The Great American Songbook - Rod Stewart (2002)
 C'mon, C'mon - Sheryl Crow (2002)
 As Time Goes By: The Great American Songbook, Volume II - Rod Stewart (2003)
 Rules of Travel - Rosanne Cash (2003)
 Hotel Paper - Michelle Branch (2003)
 Breakaway - Kelly Clarkson (2004)
 Indigo: Women of Song - Olivia Newton-John (2004)
 Fijación Oral, Vol. 1 - Shakira (2005)
 Oral Fixation, Vol. 2 - Shakira (2005)
 Black Cadillac - Rosanne Cash (2006)
 These Four Walls - Shawn Colvin (2006)
 Romancing the '60s - Frankie Valli (2007)
 My December - Kelly Clarkson (2007)
 Nobody Left to Crown - Richie Havens (2008)
 The List - Rosanne Cash (2009)
 Everything Comes and Goes - Michelle Branch (2010)
 Time Together - Michael Franks (2011)
 Laughing Down Crying - Daryl Hall (2011)
 The Origin of Love - Mika (2012)
 The River & the Thread - Rosanne Cash (2014)
 This Is Where I Live - William Bell (2016)

Notes

References

External links
 2013 Audio Interview with Shawn Pelton from the I'd Hit That Podcast

American drummers
Living people
Hall & Oates members
1963 births
Saturday Night Live Band members
Daryl Hall and the Daryl's House Band members